"I Am" is a song by American singer Kid Rock. It was released as the fourth single from his 2003 self-titled album and with no music video, it peaked at number 28 on the Billboard Mainstream Rock chart.

Content
The song is about how he is anti-Hollywood and that he's not a fake. It was co-written by Arthur Penhallow Jr, C. Wojcik, and a local artist from Detroit, Michigan, Huck Johns.

Current lead guitarist Marlon Young appeared on the song. He would become Kid Rock's full-time replacement for Kenny Olson on lead guitar in 2008. He plays electric guitar on the song.

Track listing
 "I Am" (Radio Edit) - 4:32
 "I Am" (Album version) - 5:02

Charts

2003 songs
2004 singles
Kid Rock songs
Atlantic Records singles
Songs written by Kid Rock